Lambareiði is a village on the Faroese island of Eysturoy in Runavík Municipality.

The 2009 population was 10.

External links
Personal Danish site with photographs of Lambareiði

See also
 List of towns in the Faroe Islands

Populated places in the Faroe Islands